Oluwaseun Adegbola (born 23 September 1999) is a Nigerian professional footballer who plays for Enyimba.

References

External links 
 
 
 Player's profile at pressball.by

1999 births
Living people
Nigerian footballers
Nigerian expatriate footballers
Nigerian expatriate sportspeople in Belarus
Expatriate footballers in Belarus
Association football defenders
FC Isloch Minsk Raion players
Enyimba F.C. players
Sportspeople from Ibadan